Sürekli is a village in the Yüksekova District of Hakkâri Province in Turkey. The village is populated by Kurds of the Doski tribe and had a population of 116 in 2021.

Sürekli has the three hamlets of Aşağıtarlacık, Yukarıtarlacık and Taşyazı attached to it.

References 

Villages in Yüksekova District
Kurdish settlements in Hakkâri Province